Iuliu Jenei (23 December 1939 – 19 September 2019) was a Romanian football central defender. Ienei was the first player that reached 300 appearances for Steagul Roșu Brașov in the Romanian top-league Divizia A.

Honours
Steagul Roșu Brașov
Divizia B: 1968–69

References

External links
Iuliu Jenei at Labtof.ro

1939 births
2019 deaths
Romanian footballers
Association football defenders
Liga I players
Liga II players
CSM Câmpia Turzii players
FC Politehnica Timișoara players
FC Brașov (1936) players
People from Câmpia Turzii